Hossein Najmabadi is an Iranian medical scientist and the director of Genetics Research Center at  University of Social Welfare and Rehabilitation Sciences (USWR). Najmabadi is known for his significant contribution to the genetics of mental retardation.

Najmabadi studied biology at the University of  North  Texas and hold a PhD in molecular biology from the same university in 1989. He then joined UCLA as a postdoc and in 1995 he was appointed as a faculty member at Charles Drew University of Medicine & Science - UCLA.

See also
Science in Iran

References

External links
Hossein Najmabadi's publications
Genetics Research Center at USWR

Iranian medical researchers
Living people
Year of birth missing (living people)
Academic staff of the University of Social Welfare and Rehabilitation Sciences
University of California, Los Angeles faculty